Flesh on Flesh is a 2002 album by Italian-American jazz fusion and Latin jazz guitarist Al Di Meola. The album contains new compositions and reworkings of older ones as well.

Track listing
All songs by Al Di Meola unless otherwise noted.
"Zona Desperata" – 9:23
"Innamorata" – 8:38
"Meninas" (Egberto Gismonti) – 5:41
"Flesh on Flesh" – 5:57
"Fugata" (Ástor Piazzolla) – 5:46
"Deep and Madly" – 1:45
"Saffire Soleil" – 4:11
"Señor Mouse" (Chick Corea) – 9:24

Personnel
Al Di Meola – guitar
Anthony Jackson – bass
Gumbi Ortiz – percussion
Mario Parmisano– keyboards
Ernie Adams – drums
Alejandro Santos – flutes
Gonzalo Rubalcaba – Fender Rhodes on "Zona Desperata" and "Fugata"

Charts

References

2002 albums
Al Di Meola albums
Telarc Records albums